Pyropteron affine is a moth of the family Sesiidae. It is found in most of Europe, except Ireland, Great Britain, the Netherlands, Denmark, Fennoscandia, the Baltic region, Poland and Bulgaria. It is also found in Asia Minor, Georgia, the Middle East and North Africa (Tunisia, Algeria and Morocco).

The wingspan is 15–18 mm. Adults are on wing from May to July.

The larvae of ssp. affine feed on Helianthemum chamaecistus, Helianthemum vulgare, Helianthemum nummularium and Fumana procumbens, while the larvae of ssp. erodiiphagum have been recorded on Erodium arborescens.

Subspecies
Pyropteron affine affine
Pyropteron affine erodiiphagum (Dumont, 1922) (Tunisia, Algeria, Morocco)

References

Moths described in 1856
Sesiidae
Moths of Europe
Moths of Asia